White Waters is a 2007 Nigerian slice of life drama film directed by Izu Ojukwu. The film received 12 nominations and won four awards at the 4th Africa Movie Academy Awards including winning Best Director, Best Cinematography, Best Sound and Best Actress award in a Supporting Role for Joke Silva.

Cast
OC Ukeje as Melvin
Rita Dominic as Norlah
Joke Silva as Grandmother of Melvin
Hoom Suk as Banji
Tony Ofili Akpon as Coach Samson
Edward Fom as Emeka
Fidelis Abdulrahman as Little Melvin
Precious Olaitan as David

References

2007 films
2007 drama films
Nigerian drama films
Films directed by Izu Ojukwu